Kim Mi-seon (born 5 March 1983) is a South Korean former field hockey player. She competed at the 2004 Summer Olympics and the 2008 Summer Olympics.

References

External links
 

1983 births
Living people
South Korean female field hockey players
Olympic field hockey players of South Korea
Field hockey players at the 2004 Summer Olympics
Field hockey players at the 2008 Summer Olympics
Place of birth missing (living people)
Field hockey players at the 2006 Asian Games
Asian Games competitors for South Korea